Paul John Clauson (born 16 September 1949) is a former Australian politician.

Early life and family 

Clauson was born in Brisbane to Alan George Malcolm Clauson and Ethel Marjory, née Montgomery. He attended Wellington Point Primary School and then Brisbane Church of England Grammar School. He studied law at the University of Queensland.

Legal career 
He was a solicitor and public servant, 1972 to 1973, and then a judge's associate in 1974 to 1975. From 1975 to 1985 he ran a legal practice; and as Attorney-General, he was called to the Bar in 1987. From 31 October 2014, he was appointed in the role of Legal Services Commissioner Queensland for a three-year term.

Parliamentary career 
In 1985 he was elected to the Queensland Legislative Assembly as the National Party member for Redlands in a by-election. 
He was promoted to the front-bench as Attorney-General and Minister for Justice in 1986 where he was responsible for administration of the Queensland Judicial System including justice legislation, prison administration and development and matters associated with the development and promotion of legislative reform, victims rights and corporate regulation.

As Attorney-General of Queensland, he played an important government role in the operation of the Fitzgerald Inquiry into police corruption from 1987 to 1989.
 
He was Attorney-General and Minister for Heritage and the Arts	from 25 September 1989 to 7 December 1989, Minister for Justice and Attorney-General and Minister for Corrective Services from 19 January 1989 to 29 August 1989, Minister for Justice and Attorney-General from 9 December 1987 to 19 January 1989 and Attorney-General and Minister for Justice from 18 November 1986 to 1 December 1987.

Clauson lost his seat in 1989; he ran again unsuccessfully in 1992.

Post-Parliamentary career 
He has worked as a consultant following the end of his parliamentary career and has been a Committee Member and executive director of the Infrastructure Association of Queensland for over 15 years and an adjunct professor at Bond University for the past 3 years.

He was a member of the board of directors for Ormiston College from March 1991 to September 2014.

Personal life 
His interests include yachting, gardening, fishing, reading, politics, history, cricket and local community groups. 
He is a member of the Royal Queensland Yacht Squadron, United Service (Qld), Redlands Cricketers Club and Redlands Bowling Club.

References

1949 births
Living people
National Party of Australia members of the Parliament of Queensland
Members of the Queensland Legislative Assembly
Attorneys-General of Queensland
People from Redland City